Gold is a chemical element with symbol Au and atomic number 79.

Gold may also refer to:

Arts, entertainment, and media

Fictional characters
 Gold, a member of the Metal Men in the DC Comics universe

Films
 Gold (1932 film), an American film directed by Otto Brower
 Gold (1934 film), a German film directed by Karl Hartl
 Gold (1955 film), a Canadian short documentary directed by Colin Low
 Gold (1974 film), a film starring Roger Moore
 Gold (2013 film), a German film directed by Thomas Arslan
 Gold (2014 film), an Irish comedy film
 Gold (2015 film), a German short documentary directed by Alexander Tuschinski
 Gold (2016 film), an American crime drama
 Gold (2017 film), a Spanish historical drama
 Gold (2018 film), an Indian historical sports drama
 Gold (2022 Australian film), a survival thriller film directed by Anthony Hayes
 Gold (2022 Indian film), an Indian Malayalam-language comedy drama film

Literature
 Gold (Asimov), a 1995 collection of short stories by Isaac Asimov
 Gold (Cleave novel), a 2012 novel by Chris Cleave
 Gold (Rhodes novel), a 2007 novel by Dan Rhodes
 "Gold" (short story), a 1991 science fiction story by Isaac Asimov

Music

Albums
 Gold (Barbara Dickson album), a 1985 album
 Gold (The Beautiful South album), a 2006 Greatest Hits album
 Gold (Britt Nicole album), a 2012 album
 Gold (Crystal Lewis album), a 1998 album
 Gold (Garnett Silk album), a 2000 album
 Gold (Jasmine album), a 2010 album
 Gold (Marika Gombitová album), a 2005 Slovak album
 Gold (Modus album), a 2005 album
 Gold (Ohio Players album), a 1976 soul/funk album
 Gold (Ricky Dillon album), an album
 Gold (Ryan Adams album), a 2001 album
 Gold (Sister Sparrow album), a 2018 album
 Gold (Starflyer 59 album), a 1995 album
 The Gold Record, a 2006 album by The Bouncing Souls
 Gold (compilation album), several albums with this title
 Gold, a 2004 album by The Fucking Am

Extended plays
 Gold (Jessie James Decker EP), 2017
 Gold (Metro Station EP), 2014
 Gold (Sir Sly EP), 2013
 Gold Gold Gold, an EP by Foals

Songs
 "Gold" (Amanda Lear song), 1978
 "Gold" (B'z song), 2001
 "Gold" (Beverley Knight song), 2002
 "Gold" (Chet Faker song), 2014
 "Gold" (Dierks Bentley song), 2022
 "Gold" (Imagine Dragons song), 2015
 "Gold" (John Stewart song), 1979
 "Gold" (Kiiara song), 2015
 "Gold" (Neon Hitch song), 2012
 "Gold" (Prince song), 1995
 "Gold" (Spandau Ballet song), 1983
 "Gold" (Uverworld song), 2010
 "Gold" (Victoria Justice song), 2013
 "The Gold", by Manchester Orchestra from A Black Mile to the Surface, 2017
 "Gold", by Antoine Clamaran, 2009
 "Gold", by Britt Nicole from Gold, 2012
 "Gold", by Brockhampton from Saturation, 2017
 "Gold", by East 17 from Walthamstow, 1992
 "Gold", by Eden from Vertigo, 2017
 "Gold", by Gabriel Ríos, 2014
 "Gold", by Macklemore & Ryan Lewis from The Heist, 2012
 "Gold", by Marina and the Diamonds from Froot, 2015
 "Gold", by Owl City from Shooting Star and The Midsummer Station, 2012
 "Gold", by Sir Sly from Gold, 2013
 "Gold", by Sleeping with Sirens from Madness, 2015
 "Gold", by The Sugarcubes from Stick Around for Joy, 1992
 "Gold", by Trixie Mattel from Barbara, 2020

Other uses in music
 Gold (band), a French band
 Gold album, an album or single that has sold a minimum number of copies
 Gold CD, a compact disc made of gold instead of aluminium

Radio
 Gold (British radio network), a British radio network created in 2007
 Gold (New Zealand radio network), a New Zealand radio network
 Gold 905, a Singaporean radio station

Television
 Gold (Australian TV channel), a regional Australian television channel
 Gold (UK TV channel), a British television channel
 ANT1 Gold, a spin-off satellite channel from Antenna Group

Brands and enterprises
 Gold (biscuit), a caramel covered biscuit made by McVities
 Stagecoach Gold, a luxury bus brand in the United Kingdom

Places
 Gold (crater), impact crater on Mars
 Fine Gold, California, a community in Madera County, formerly known as Gold
 Gold Beach, the code name for one of the D-Day landing beaches that Allied forces used to invade German-occupied France during World War II

Science and technology
 Gold (color), shade of the metal gold
 Gold (linker),  a linker designed to be faster than GNU ld
 Going gold, in a software-release life-cycle, when a piece of software becomes ready for mass distribution
 Gold open access, a framework for publishing and distributing open-access scholarly research
 Isotopes of gold

Other uses
 Gold (hieroglyph), an Egyptian language hieroglyph
 Gold (surname)
 Golds (ethnic group), an old name for the Nanai people
 Gold language, the Nanai language
 Haryana Gold, Indian professional basketball team
 Ornaments of Gold, or az-Zukhruf, the 43rd sura of the Qur'an
 Metal (wuxing), an element in Chinese philosophy
 Edible gold, a form of gold that is edible

See also
 
 
 Au (disambiguation)
 Black and Gold (disambiguation)
 Black Gold (disambiguation)
 Blue and Gold (disambiguation)
 Blue Gold (disambiguation)
 Fool's Gold (disambiguation)
 GOLD (disambiguation)
 Gold Award (disambiguation)
 Golden (disambiguation) 
 Gold digger (disambiguation)
 Gold Dust (disambiguation) 
 Gold medal (disambiguation)
 Goldmine (disambiguation)
 Gold River (disambiguation)
 Gold Star (disambiguation)
Pokémon Gold
 Red Gold (disambiguation)
 WarioWare Gold
 White Gold (disambiguation)

 
 :Category:Gold compounds